Republic New York Corporation was the holding company for 
Republic National Bank of New York,
Safra Republic Holdings,
and Safra Republic Bank.

The company was controlled by billionaire Edmond Safra, who was killed in a fire in his Monte Carlo penthouse apartment by his nurse Ted Maher.  Republic New York Corporation was sold shortly after its chairman's death to HSBC Bank USA, the US subsidiary of HSBC of the UK.

Joseph Safra, the brother of Edmond Safra, controlled and owned independently the Safra Group of banks and financial institutions.

History

1966: Republic National Bank of New York is founded by Edmond Safra.  Safra had previously opened the Trade Development Bank in Geneva, Switzerland, which acquired a 36% stake in Republic.

1973: Republic New York Corporation was established as a one-bank holding company for Republic National Bank.

1974: Acquires Kings Lafayette Bank, which has 18 branches.

1975: Acquires American Swiss Credit Company, Ltd., formerly part of Franklin National Bank.

1977: Opens Republic Factors Corporation.

1978: Opens Republic International Bank of New York in Miami, Florida.

1980: Republic is listed on the New York Stock Exchange. Opens Republic International Bank of New York in Los Angeles, California.

1983: Edmond Safra sells Trade Development Bank to American Express.  Several years later, American Express tries to smear Safra, after he attempts to open a competing business.

1987: Acquires The Williamsburg Savings Bank.

1988: Edmond Safra organizes Safra Holdings S.A. in Geneva, Switzerland, which is 49% owned by Republic.

1990: Acquires Manhattan Savings Bank.

1992: Establishes Republic New York Securities Corporation.

1993: Acquires SafraCorp California and renames it Republic Bank California N.A.  Acquires Bank Leumi of Canada.  Acquires Mase Westpac Limited, which is a member of the London Gold Fixing.  Acquires Citibank's World Banknote Services operations.

1995: Acquires Crossland Federal Savings Bank.

1999: HSBC acquires Republic New York for US$9.8-billion.

2001: Republic pleads guilty to fraud and agrees to restitution of $606 million in connection with cheating Japanese customers by its Republic New York Securities Corporation subsidiary.</ref> Their partner at the time Martin Armstrong was convicted and spent 11 years in prison. 

2015: Safra Group purchased Chiquita Brands International

Safra Republic Holdings

Thousand year bonds
Safra Republic Holdings issued $250 million of 1,000 year bonds in 1997, at a time when there were "a number of 100-year bond issues by corporations."

Safra's banking interests catered to clients looking for tax havens in Switzerland, Luxembourg and Monaco.

Republic National Bank of New York

Republic National Bank of New York operated without the "Of New York" part of its full name, even though the name 
"Republic National Bank of" had at times been
used elsewhere.

From 1980 until Safra's death, Walter Weiner was Safra's attorney and CEO of Republic National Bank of New York and, in 1983, Wiener became chairman of the bank.

In 1981, Republic National Bank of New York sought a tax abatement to construct its Fifth Avenue headquarters. The bank was the first midtown project to be turned down since the city's brush with bankruptcy in the mid-1970's. Kenneth Schuman, chairman of the city's Industrial and Commercial Incentive Board, said that the market had become strong enough so that construction would take place without the tax abatement.

In 1998, Safra's Republic National Bank of New York was the preferred foreign bank through which most Russian banks had correspondent accounts. Both Russian banks, including SBS-Agro, Menatep, Inkom, and United Bank, and the Russian Ministry of Finance transferred IMF loan money to foreign locations through Safra's Republic National Bank of New York.

On 17 August 1998, the Republic National Bank of New York lost 45% of its net income due to its large holding of Russian bonds that became worthless after the 1998 Russian financial crisis.

In 1999, Safra sold Safra Republic Holdings and Republic New York Corporation to HSBC for $10.3 billion in cash. On 31 December 1999, HSBC Private Bank became the new name for Safra's former holdings.

When Republic was taken over by HSBC Bank USA, which already had acquired the former Marine Midland Bank, the combination retained what Republic had previously achieved: "the third-biggest retail branch network in the New York region." Two competitive parts of their operation
were "low-cost checking and free automated teller machine services."

References

Defunct banks of the United States
HSBC acquisitions
Banks established in 1966
1966 establishments in New York City
Banks disestablished in 1999
1999 disestablishments in New York (state)
1999 mergers and acquisitions